Lincoln is a constituency in Lincolnshire, England represented in the House of Commons of the UK Parliament since 2019 by Karl McCartney, a Conservative Party politician.

Since the split of the seat City of York with effect from the 2010 general election, Lincoln has been the oldest constituency in continuous existence in the UK – established in 1265. Lincoln was a bellwether between 1974 and 2017. The seat bucked the national Conservative victory in 1970 by electing a Labour MP, as it did in 2017.

The seat has been considered relative to others an ultra-marginal seat, as well as a swing seat, since 2005 as its winner's majority has not exceeded 6.9% of the vote since the 12.5% majority won in 2005 and the seat has changed hands three times since that year.

Boundaries

1885–1918: The existing parliamentary borough, and the parish of Bracebridge.

1918–1950: The County Borough of Lincoln, and the Urban District of Bracebridge.

1950–1974: The County Borough of Lincoln.

1974–1983: As prior but with redrawn boundaries.

1983–1997: The City of Lincoln, and the District of North Kesteven wards of Bracebridge Heath, North Hykeham Central, North Hykeham North, North Hykeham South, Skellingthorpe, and Waddington West.

1997–2010: The City of Lincoln, and the District of North Kesteven ward of Bracebridge Heath.

2010–present: The City of Lincoln, and the District of North Kesteven wards of Bracebridge Heath and Waddington East, and Skellingthorpe.

The constituency, as its name suggests, covers the cathedral city of Lincoln in Lincolnshire, and most of its directly adjoining villages.

History
Lincoln first sent Members to Parliament in 1265, thirty years before the first all-over coverage of cities and qualifying towns was introduced in the Model Parliament, and has done so ever since, although no records exist from before the end of the 13th century. The early elections were held at the Guildhall and the burgesses elected were usually officials of the borough.

The representation, originally two Members ("burgesses"), was reduced to one Member in 1885.

The seat was represented for five years by former Cabinet minister Margaret Jackson, later Margaret Beckett. Lincoln became the oldest constituency in the country in 2010 when the City of York constituency was divided.

Constituency profile
The seat includes the University of Lincoln. From 1945 to 1972 Lincoln was continuously held by the Labour Party, often as a safe seat. The city has good transport links with Nottingham, Hull and the smaller ancient market towns in Lincolnshire, such as Spalding, Market Rasen and Boston. Lincoln was a bellwether constituency from October 1974 to 2015, voting for the party which would form the government in each election. In 2017 Labour took the seat despite being the 2nd largest party nationwide.

Members of Parliament

MPs 1265–1660

MPs 1660–1885

MPs 1885–present

Elections

Elections in the 2010s

Elections in the 2000s

Elections in the 1990s

Elections in the 1980s

Elections in the 1970s

Elections in the 1960s

Elections in the 1950s

Election in the 1940s

General Election 1939/40

Another General Election was required to take place before the end of 1940. The political parties had been making preparations for an election to take place from 1939 and by the end of this year, the following candidates had been selected; 
Conservative: Walter Liddall
Labour: George Deer
Liberal: 
British Union: E. H. Adams

Elections in the 1930s

Elections in the 1920s

Elections in the 1910s

General Election 1914/15

Another General Election was required to take place before the end of 1915. The political parties had been making preparations for an election to take place and by July 1914, the following candidates had been selected; 
Liberal: Charles Roberts
Unionist: J. Foster

Elections in the 1900s

Elections in the 1890s

Elections in the 1880s

 

 Caused by Palmer's death.

Elections in the 1870s

Elections in the 1860s

 

 
 

 
 

 Caused by Heneage's resignation.

 Caused by Sibthorp's death.

Elections in the 1850s

 
 
 

 

 

 Caused by Sibthorp's death.

Elections in the 1840s

 
 

 Caused by Seely's election being declared void on petition, due to bribery by his agent, on 10 March 1848

Elections in the 1830s

See also
 List of parliamentary constituencies in Lincolnshire

Notes

References

Sources
Guardian Unlimited Politics (Election results from 1992 to the present)
Politicsresources.net - Official Web Site ✔ (Election results from 1951 to the present)

Politics of Lincoln, England
Parliamentary constituencies in Lincolnshire
Constituencies of the Parliament of the United Kingdom established in 1265